Events from the year 1871 in Ireland.

Events
1 January – Church of Ireland disestablished. St Patrick's Cathedral, Dublin, becomes the National Cathedral.
15 April – Ormeau Park is opened to the public by Belfast City Council.
16 June – The Westmeath Act is enacted allowing arrest and detention without trial.
J. P. Mahaffy appointed to the Chair of Ancient History at Trinity College Dublin at the age of 32.

Arts and literature

Sport

Hare coursing
Waterloo Cup won by Master McGrath for the third time.

Births
8 January – James Craig, 1st Viscount Craigavon, first Prime Minister of Northern Ireland (died 1940).
14 January – A. M. Sullivan, lawyer (died 1959).
16 January – Valentine McEntee, 1st Baron McEntee, Labour MP in the United Kingdom (died 1953).
19 January – Frederick Barton Maurice, soldier, military correspondent, writer and academic, founded the British Legion in 1920 (died 1951).
13 February – Joseph Devlin, Nationalist politician and MP in the British House of Commons and in Northern Ireland (died 1934).
30 March – William Lyle, medical practitioner and Ulster Unionist Party politician (died 1949).
16 April – John Millington Synge, dramatist, poet and writer (died 1909).
18 April – Frederick Field, Royal Navy Admiral of the Fleet and First Sea Lord (died 1945).
? May – Elinor Darwin, née Monsell, engraver and portrait painter (died 1954 in England).
17 July – J. M. Andrews, second Prime Minister of Northern Ireland (died 1956).
30 August – James Nathaniel Halbert, entomologist (died 1948).
30 November – Thomas O'Donnell, barrister, judge, Irish Nationalist, MP (died 1943).
November – Thomas Moles, Ulster Unionist politician and journalist (died 1937).
26 December – Chicago May, born Mary Anne Duignan, criminal (died 1929 in the United States).

Deaths
2 January – Samuel Blackall, soldier, politician and second Governor of Queensland, Australia (born 1809).
3 February – James Sheridan Muspratt, research chemist and teacher (born 1821).
20 February – Paul Kane, painter in Canada (born 1810).
1 March – Anthony Coningham Sterling, British Army officer and historian (born 1805).
4 July – James Duffy, author and publisher (born 1809).
2 October – Sir Thomas Deane, architect (born 1792).
6 October – Edwin Wyndham-Quin, 3rd Earl of Dunraven and Mount-Earl, peer (born 1812).
30 November – John T. Mills, lawyer and Supreme Court Justice for the Republic of Texas (born 1817).
8 December – James Murray, physician (born 1788)
15 December – John George, politician, judge and in 1859 Solicitor-General for Ireland (born 1804).

References

 
1870s in Ireland
Ireland
Years of the 19th century in Ireland
 Ireland